Gopichand Kundalik Padalkar (born 1 October 1982) is an Indian politician. He is a member of the Bharatiya Janata Party. He is a member of Maharashtra Legislative Council. He got elected to the Legislative Council by MLA's (unopposed) on 14 May 2020. Previously he was with the Vanchit Bahujan Aghadi, he started his political career with the Rashtriya Samaj Paksha. He rejoined BJP before the 2019 Maharashtra Legislative Elections. He is also a film maker and an actor.

Early life 

He was born to  Kundlik and Hiramaai Padalkar of Padalkarwadi, Sangli district. His father Kundlik Padalkar was a primary teacher. Gopichand Padalkar belongs to Dhangar community from Maharashtra, He is a Higher Secondary School graduate.

Career 
He started his political career with the Rashtriya Samaj Paksha of Mahadev Jankar. He has unsuccessfully contested elections for District council once, Vidhan Sabha thrice and Lok Sabha once, before his election to the Maharashtra Legislative Council.

In 2014 he joined Bhartiya Janata Party and contested 2014 assembly election from Atpadi-Khanapur constituency, subsequently he left the party and he joined Vanchit Bahujan Aghadi contesting  Sangali Lok Sabha seat in the summer of 2019. As a losing candidate he gave a tough fight securing over three lakh votes, after his loss he rejoined BJP in October 2019  and contested Vidhan Sabha elections from Baramati against Ajit Pawar.

He got elected to the Legislative Council by MLA's (unopposed) on 14 May 2020, along with 9 others.

Positions Held 
 Member of Maharashtra Legislative Council 14 May 2020.
 Spokesperson of BJP,Maharashtra

References 

1982 births
Marathi people
Living people
Indian politicians
Bharatiya Janata Party politicians from Maharashtra
Members of the Maharashtra Legislative Council
People from Sangli district